Dongguk University Station is a station on the Seoul Subway Line 3 located in Jangchung-dong 2-ga, Jung-gu, Seoul, Seoul. As its name indicates, it serves the nearby Dongguk University. In addition, Jangchung Gymnasium, an indoor sports arena most famous for hosting ssireum (Korean wrestling) matches on holidays, is outside Exit 5. It is also the closest station to Shilla Hotel.

Station layout

Vicinity
Jokbal Street
Jangchungdong (administrative name of this area) is famous for food shops serving Jokbal, Bindaetteok and Cola.

Jangchungdan Park
Entrance No.6 comes out in Janchungdan park with many paths and a roller-skating rink.

Street Stalls
There are many near entrance no. 2 serving for example Tteokbokki, Mandu and Sundaes.

References 

Seoul Metropolitan Subway stations
Metro stations in Jung District, Seoul
Railway stations in South Korea opened in 1985
Seoul Subway Line 3
Dongguk University